Kalinovka is a rural locality (a settlement) in Alexeyevsky Selsoviet, Blagoveshchensky District, Altai Krai, Russia. The population was 64 as of 2013. There are 2 streets.

Geography 
Kalinovka is located 62 km east of Blagoveshchenka (the district's administrative centre) by road. Vyacheslavka is the nearest rural locality.

References 

Rural localities in Blagoveshchensky District, Altai Krai